Vera Cruz is a municipality in the state of São Paulo in Brazil. The population is 10,823 (2020 est.) in an area of 248 km². The elevation is 628 m.

References

Municipalities in São Paulo (state)